Liu Bainian, or Anthony Liu, is the honorary chairman of the state-run Catholic Patriotic Association (CPA) and the Bishops Conference of the Catholic Church in China (BCCCC), the body which oversees the selection and ordination of bishops in China.

Born in Shandong Province, Liu was named secretary-general of the CPA in 1980, and subsequently served as vice president of the organization,
which operates under the control of the State Administration for Religious Affairs. Liu has stated his belief that the government of the People's Republic of China should appoint its own bishops, without recognizing the authority of the Holy See.

Notes

Catholic Patriotic Association
Chinese Christian religious leaders
Living people
1934 births
People's Republic of China politicians from Shandong